Schulhof or Schulhoff is a German and a Yiddish surname meaning schoolyard or synagogal yard. Notable people with the surname include:

Schulhof:
 Lipót Schulhof (1847–1921), Hungarian astronomer
 2384 Schulhof, main-belt asteroid named for him
 Nathan Schulhof (born 1949), American businessman
 David Schulhof (born 1971), American music and entertainment executive

Schulhoff:
 Erwin Schulhoff (1894–1942), Czech composer and pianist
 Julius Schulhoff (1825–1898), Czech pianist and composer, musicologist, great-uncle of Erwin Schulhoff
 Courtney Schulhoff (born 1987)

See also
 Flint S. Schulhofer (1926–2006), American racehorse trainer

German-language surnames
Jewish surnames